Angolan Olympic Committee (IOC code: ANG) is the National Olympic Committee representing Angola. It was created on 17 February 1979 and recognized by the International Olympic Committee in February 1980.

History
The committee was founded on 17 February 1979 and was recognised provisionally by the Executive Board of the IOC at Nagoya, Japan in October 1979. This recognition was confirmed at the 82nd Session of the IOC at Lake Placid in February 1980.

Presidents

See also
 Angola at the Olympics

References

External links
 Official website

Angola
 
1979 establishments in Angola
Olympic